Port Harcourt is the largest city in Rivers State, and the second largest commercial city in Nigeria.

Port Harcourt may also refer to:

 Port Harcourt (local government area)
 Port Harcourt Book Festival, a literary festival 
 Port Harcourt Cemetery
 Port Harcourt International Airport
 Port Harcourt International Fashion Week, an annual clothing and fashion event
 Port Harcourt Is Back, a song by Muma Gee from Motherland
 Port Harcourt NAF Base, an airport
 Port Harcourt Refining Company
 Port Harcourt Sharks, a football club
 Port Harcourt Son, a song by singer Duncan Mighty
 Port Harcourt Zoo

See also
 University of Port Harcourt